The 2002 World Rowing Championships were World Rowing Championships that were held from 15 to 22 September 2002 on the Guadalquivir at Seville, Spain.  Adaptive events were held for the first time at a World Championships.

Medal summary

Men's events
 Non-Olympic classes

Women's events
 Non-Olympic classes

Para 
Pararowing (or adaptive rowing) was first included in rowing world championships in 2002.

Medal table

References

World Rowing Championships
World Rowing Championships
Rowing Championships
Sports competitions in Seville
Rowing Championships
Rowing competitions in Spain
21st century in Seville
Rowing